HP11 or variant, may refer to:

 HP11, a postcode for Wycombe Marsh, see HP postcode area
 HP-11, an alternate name for the C battery
 HP-11C, a calculator in the Hewlett-Packard Voyager series
 Schreder Airmate HP-11, a glider
 Handley Page H.P.11, an airplane that is a model of Handley Page Type O

See also
 HP (disambiguation)